Pyne(Bengali: পাইন) is an Indian surname. Alternative spellings include Paine and Pain. 

Ganesh Pyne Artist
Bedabrata Pain Film Maker

References

Hindu surnames
Surnames
Social groups of Odisha